Kachalkent is a rural locality (a selo) in Tsmursky Selsoviet, Suleyman-Stalsky District, Republic of Dagestan, Russia. The population was 256 as of 2010.

Geography 
Kachalkent is located 12 km west of Kasumkent (the district's administrative centre) by road. Tsmur is the nearest rural locality.

References 

Rural localities in Suleyman-Stalsky District